Mary Kom is a 2014 Indian biographical sports drama film directed by Omung Kumar and produced by Sanjay Leela Bhansali and Viacom 18 Motion Pictures. The film features Priyanka Chopra in the lead role as the boxer Mary Kom, with Darshan Kumar and Sunil Thapa in supporting roles as her husband and mentor, Onler Kom and M. Narjit Singh respectively. The film was written by Saiwyn Quadras, with the cinematography provided by Keiko Nakahara while Bhansali co-edited the film with Rajesh G. Pandey. The film follows Kom's journey of becoming a boxer to her victory at the 2008 World Boxing Championships in Ningbo, China.

Before its theatrical release on 5 September 2014, the film premiered at the 2014 Toronto International Film Festival, where it became the first Hindi film to be screened on the opening night of the film festival. The film received generally positive reviews from critics and was a commercial success. Mary Kom has received various awards and nominations, with praise for its direction, Chopra's performance, screenplay, editing, background score, and costume design. As of August 2015, the film has won 20 awards.

At the 62nd National Film Awards, the film won the National Film Award for Best Popular Film Providing Wholesome Entertainment.  It was nominated for Best Film, and Best Actress for Chopra at the 60th Filmfare Awards. Mary Kom received ten nominations at the 2014 Star Guild Awards, including Best Film and Best Director, winning five awards: Best Actress in a Leading Role for Chopra, Best Debut Director for Kumar, Best Costume Design, Dialogue of the Year, and the Guild Presidents Award for Best Film. The film garnered eight nominations at the 21st Screen Awards, winning Best Actress for Chopra.

Accolades

See also
 List of Bollywood films of 2014

Footnotes

References

External links
 Accolades for Mary Kom at the Internet Movie Database

Lists of accolades by Indian film